The Evacuation of Kolkanpää took place between October 18 and 27, 1708, close to Kolkanpää, in the Swedish Empire during the Great Northern War. The Swedes under the command of Georg Lybecker were evacuating their Finnish-based army consisting of up to 11,279 men back to Finland after their failed campaign in Swedish Ingria in an attempt to recover land previously lost to Russia. Fyodor Apraksin, the Russian commander in the area, decided to interrupt the evacuation with between 3,000 and 3,500 men. He decided to wait until only a portion, between 600 and 800 Saxon ex-prisoners recruited into Swedish service, remained on the beaches not yet evacuated before commencing attack with all his troops. After several assaults the Saxons were soon overwhelmed and almost all of them were cut down or captured by the end of the battle. About 50 Russians were killed and 220 wounded. The Swedes were also forced to slaughter about 4,000 of their horses which could not be evacuated so they would not fall into Russian hands.

References

Conflicts in 1708
1708 in Europe
Kolkanpaa
Kolkanpaa
Kolkanpaa
History of Leningrad Oblast